Qaleh Now (also Romanized as Qal`eh Now; also known as Qalehno) is a village in Fahlian Rural District, in the Central District of Mamasani County, Fars Province, Iran. At the 2006 census, its population was 183, in 50 families.

References 

Populated places in Mamasani County